The San Jose Sharks are a professional ice hockey team based in San Jose, California, United States. They are members of the Pacific Division of the Western Conference in the National Hockey League (NHL). Founded in 1991 as an expansion team, the Sharks have won the Pacific Division six times: in 2002, 2004, 2008, 2009, 2010 and 2011, and have made the Stanley Cup playoffs in  18 of their 24 years in the League. San Jose has not won a Stanley Cup championship to date; the Sharks' longest run in the playoffs came in 2016, when they defeated the St. Louis Blues in the Western Conference Finals to reach the 2016 Stanley Cup Finals.

Since their inception, 283 different players have played at least one regular season or playoff game for the Sharks. The team has had nine captains. Doug Wilson was the first, serving in the team's expansion years between 1991 and 1993. Igor Larionov was another early player for the team, who along with Ed Belfour are the only Sharks to be inducted into the Hockey Hall of Fame.

The Sharks grew into a perennial Pacific Division contender in the 2000s following the drafting of several players, among them including forward Patrick Marleau, taken second overall in 1997, who holds the franchise records for the most goals (404) and points (861).  Goaltender Evgeni Nabokov, selected in 1994, established himself as an NHL regular in  when he won the Calder Memorial Trophy as the NHL's top rookie. He went on to win 293 games in San Jose. Jonathan Cheechoo is the only Sharks player to score 50 goals in a season; his total of 56 in  earned him the Maurice "Rocket" Richard Trophy as the League's top goal scorer.

Joe Thornton, future Hall of Famer, was acquired in a trade with the Boston Bruins in 2005, Thornton won the Art Ross and Hart Memorial Trophies as the NHL's top scorer and most valuable player, respectively in his first season in San Jose. He has appeared in three NHL All-Star Games while a member of the Sharks, and won a gold medal competing for Canada at the 2010 Winter Olympics.

Key 
 Appeared in an Sharks game during the 2021–22 NHL season or is still part of the organization.
 retired jersey or elected to the Hockey Hall of Fame

The "Seasons" column lists the first year of the season of the player's first game and the last year of the season of the player's last game. For example, a player who played one game in the 2000–2001 season would be listed as playing with the team from 2000–2001, regardless of what calendar year the game occurred within.
Statistics complete as of the end of the 2021–22 season.

Goaltenders

Skaters

Notes 

  As of the 2005–2006 NHL season, all games have a winner; teams losing in overtime and shootouts are awarded one point thus the OTL stat replaces the tie statistic. The OTL column also includes SOL (Shootout losses).

References 
General

 
 
 
 

Specific

San Jose Sharks
 
players